David Mark Lee (born 5 November 1967 in Whitefield, Lancashire) is an English former professional footballer.

Playing career
Lee, a right winger, began his career with Bury in 1986. In five years at Gigg Lane, he made just over 200 league appearances and scored 35 goals.

Southampton came in for his services in 1991 with a successful £350,000 bid. Lee's stay on the south coast was short-lived, however; after only twenty appearances he returned to the north-west with Bolton Wanderers in a one-month loan deal. In December 1992, Bolton made the move permanent in a £275,000 deal.

Lee remained at Burnden Park for five years, clocking up 147 appearances and scoring sixteen goals. Whilst at Bolton he played in the 1995 League Cup Final.

In 1997, he joined Wigan Athletic for £250,000, and he maintained his goalscoring touch, netting eleven goals during his three years with the Latics. Whilst at Wigan he played in the final as a substitute as they won the 1998–99 Football League Trophy.

Lee joined Blackpool on loan in 1999, before making a permanent move to Carlisle United on a non-contract basis.

A year later, the midfielder joined non-league side Morecambe, with whom he finished his career.

Coaching
After retiring, he turned his hand to coaching and former club Wigan gave him his first opportunity on the ladder by naming him as their youth coach. He stayed in this position until 2007 when accepting the offer to return to Bolton as their Assistant Academy Director. He left his Bolton role after 14 years on 29 January 2021.

Career statistics

Honours
Bolton Wanderers
 First Division: 1996–97

Wigan Athletic
 Football League Trophy: 1998–99

Southampton
Full Members Cup runner-up: 1991–92

Individual
PFA Team of the Year: 1989–90 Third Division

References

External links

Profile at PlayerHistory.com 

1967 births
Living people
English footballers
People from Whitefield, Greater Manchester
Bury F.C. players
Southampton F.C. players
Bolton Wanderers F.C. players
Wigan Athletic F.C. players
Blackpool F.C. players
Carlisle United F.C. players
Morecambe F.C. players
Premier League players
Bolton Wanderers F.C. non-playing staff
Association football midfielders
Footballers from Greater Manchester